"Beautiful Soul" is a song by American singer and actor Jesse McCartney. It was released as his debut single and the lead single from his debut album, Beautiful Soul (2004), on September 14, 2004, in the United States. The song reached number one in Australia, number two in New Zealand, and number 16 in the US. It also charted in several European countries in 2005 and 2006, reaching the top 20 in Austria, Ireland, Italy, the Netherlands, and the United Kingdom. "Beautiful Soul" is certified gold in New Zealand and the United States and platinum in Australia.

Music video
The music video for "Beautiful Soul" was directed by Marc Webb. The video is heavily influenced by the film Y Tu Mamá También directed by Alfonso Cuarón. The video features several scenes that are lifted from Cuarón's film.

Chart performance
The song debuted on the Billboard Hot 100 chart of December 11, 2004, at number 72, eventually peaking at number 16 on the chart and becoming McCartney's most successful single on the Hot 100 until "Leavin'" reached number 10 in 2008. Outside the United States, the song performed moderately well in Europe, peaking within the top 40 of many European charts including those of Austria, Ireland, Italy, the Netherlands and the United Kingdom. In the Australasia region, "Beautiful Soul" was a major chart success.

On February 27, 2005, the song first charted at number 14 on Australia's ARIA chart. It entered the top 10 the next week, then reached number three on April 3. The next week, it reached the number-one position, dethroning Anthony Callea's "Rain"/"Bridge over Troubled Water". The single spent four weeks at number one, then fell 14 places to number 15 on May 8, the third-biggest fall from the top spot in ARIA chart history. The single spent only one more week on the chart before leaving the top 50, spending 12 weeks on the chart in total and appearing at number 19 on Australia's year-end chart.

In New Zealand, the song debuted within the top 10 on March 14, 2005, at number seven. It then spent the next 13 weeks rising and falling in the top 10, spending at single week at number two on the week dated May 2. It exited the top 10 on June 6, then made its final appearance in the top 40 at number 33 on July 11. Altogether, the song spent 18 weeks in the top 40 and ended the year as New Zealand's 13th best-selling single.

Track listings

Australian and New Zealand CD single
 "Beautiful Soul"
 "The Stupid Things" (acoustic version)

UK CD1 and European CD single
 "Beautiful Soul" – 3:16
 "Without U" – 3:11

UK CD2
 "Beautiful Soul" (radio edit) – 3:15
 "Get Your Shine On" – 3:11
 "Beautiful Soul" (Drew Ferrante Mix) – 3:34
 "Beautiful Soul" (video) – 3:17

Charts

Weekly charts

Year-end charts

Certifications

Release history

In popular culture

On an episode of Celebrity Duets, he sang the song in a duet with US Olympic Gymnast Carly Patterson. McCartney also sang this song on the Disney Channel sitcom The Suite Life of Zack & Cody with its episode "Rock Star in the House" and on What I Like About You with its episode "The Not-So Simple Life". It was featured on movie and TV soundtracks for That's So Raven, Sydney White, and A Cinderella Story.

References

External links

2004 songs
2004 debut singles
Jesse McCartney songs
Number-one singles in Australia
Song recordings produced by Greg Wells
Music videos directed by Marc Webb
Hollywood Records singles
Songs written by Adam Watts (musician)
Songs written by Andy Dodd